Hello is a 1999 Indian Tamil-language romantic drama film directed and written by K. Selva Bharathy. The film stars Prashanth and Preeti Jhangiani . The film was released on 7 November 1999.

Plot
Chandru works in a flower shop. He tries to woo girls and enter into a relationship, but it does not materialize. His friends tease him for being unable to find a girlfriend. Chandru has a plan to prevent them making fun of him. He requests his close friend Gayathri to come to the temple along with some of her friends so he would introduce her as his girlfriend to his friends. Chandru takes his friends with him to temple with plans of introducing Gayatri's friend as his lover. Unfortunately, Gayatri does not turn up that day, and Chandru simply points out a girl among the crowd in the temple as his lover to his friends. Chandru pretends as if he is talking frequently over phone to his lover so that his friends would believe him.

Suresh (Suresh) is Charle's friend who comes to Chennai to visit a girl for marriage proposal. He is introduced to Chandru, and they become good friends. Chandru's friends accompany Suresh while he goes to meet the girl, whose name is Swetha and inform Suresh that Swetha is in love with Chandru. Suresh feels bad that he has come to meet his friend's lover. All three leave the place without informing them. Suresh apologizes to Chandru for the incident that happened, which shocks him. Meanwhile, Swetha's brother Sekhar gets furious, meets Charle, and asks for the reason for them to stop the marriage proposal. Charle reveals that Chandru and Swetha are in love. Shekar scolds Swetha, even though she tries to prove her innocence. She feels bad that no one in her family trusts her.

Swetha consumes poison and is admitted in the hospital. Also, Shekar beats up Chandru's friends, and they are admitted in the same hospital. Chandru comes to the hospital to meet his friends and is surprised to know that Gayatri and Swetha are good friends. Gayatri tells about Swetha consuming poison, which makes Chandru feels guilty that he is responsible for all the fiascos at Swetha's house. With Gayatri's help, Chandru gets introduced to Swetha but does not disclose the truth to her. Slowly, Swetha and Chandru become good friends. Chandru also earns the trust of Swetha's family members. Gayatri gets to know that Swetha loves Chandru, and she informs him about this. Swetha's family also likes Chandru, and they decide to get them married. One day, Suresh comes to wish Chandru, knowing about his marriage. Swetha's family members get shocked seeing Chandru and Suresh together. Finally, Chandru reveals the truth, apologizes, and clarifies that his intention is not to cheat Swetha. Swetha's family members get convinced, and Chandru and Swetha unite.

Cast

Prashanth as Chandru
Preeti Jhangiani as Swetha
Ranjith as Sekhar
Sujitha as Gayathri
Manivannan as Flower Shop Owner
Charle as Chandru's friend
Vaiyapuri as Chandru's friend
Suresh as Suresh
Senthil
Ilavarasi
R. Sundarrajan
Kaka Radhakrishnan
Kanal Kannan

Production
The film marked the second venture for director K. Selva Bharathy, while it also featured Preeti Jhangiani in her first Tamil film. Being unfamiliar with the language, Preeti mouthed her longer on-screen dialogues in Hindi, and was later dubbed over by a voice artist. The actress also noted that the production of Hello was completed swiftly.

Soundtrack

The film score and the soundtrack were composed by Deva. The soundtrack, released in 1999, features 6 tracks, lyrics written by Vairamuthu and Na. Muthukumar.

References

External links
 

1999 films
1990s Tamil-language films
Indian romantic drama films
Films scored by Deva (composer)
Films directed by K. Selva Bharathy
1999 romantic drama films
Films shot in Daman and Diu